Harstad Idrettslag is a Norwegian sports club from Harstad, Troms. It has association football, futsal and nordic skiing sections. The club formerly had sections for track and field, skiing and speed skating, but this was discontinued in 1987. The club colors are yellow and black, and their home field is Harstad stadion. This was Norway's first football stadium with artificial turf.

The men's football team currently plays in the 4. divisjon, the fifth tier of Norwegian football. The team last played in the Norwegian First Division in 1997. After that they had a long run in the Second Division. It played in the Third Division in 2003, but won their group and won the playoff 5–2 on aggregate against Innstranden. In 2008 they were back in the Third Division, won the league but lost the playoff to Bodø/Glimt 2 with 6–5 on aggregate after extra time. The next season they won the playoff, beating Stålkameratene 3–2 on aggregate. After two season in the Second Division, Harstad was again relegated in 2011.

The club also won the Northern Norwegian Cup nine times: in 1932, 1938, 1953, 1954, 1955, 1957, 1958, 1962 and 1968. A well-known player from that era is Trygve Bornø.

Recent history 
{|class="wikitable"
|-bgcolor="#efefef"
! Season
! 
! Pos.
! Pl.
! W
! D
! L
! GS
! GA
! P
!Cup
!Notes
|-
|2008
|3. divisjon
|align=right |1
|align=right|20||align=right|15||align=right|2||align=right|1
|align=right|130||align=right|13||align=right|47
||First round
|
|-
|2009
|3. divisjon
|align=right bgcolor=#DDFFDD| 1
|align=right|20||align=right|18||align=right|2||align=right|0
|align=right|139||align=right|16||align=right|56
||First round
|Promoted
|-
|2010
|2. divisjon
|align=right |5
|align=right|26||align=right|13||align=right|2||align=right|11
|align=right|58||align=right|51||align=right|41
||First round
|
|-
|2011
|2. divisjon
|align=right bgcolor="#FFCCCC"| 12
|align=right|26||align=right|7||align=right|4||align=right|15
|align=right|41||align=right|58||align=right|25
||First round
|Relegated
|-
|2012
|3. divisjon
|align=right bgcolor=#DDFFDD| 2
|align=right|22||align=right|15||align=right|4||align=right|3
|align=right|72||align=right|24||align=right|49
||Second round
|Promoted
|-
|2013
|2. divisjon
|align=right |10
|align=right|26||align=right|8||align=right|8||align=right|10
|align=right|44||align=right|44||align=right|32
||Second round
|
|-
|2014 
|2. divisjon
|align=right |8
|align=right|26||align=right|12||align=right|3||align=right|11
|align=right|46||align=right|33||align=right|39
||Second round
|
|-
|2015 
|2. divisjon
|align=right |8
|align=right|26||align=right|9||align=right|7||align=right|10
|align=right|34||align=right|42||align=right|34
||First round
|
|-
|2016
|2. divisjon
|align=right bgcolor="#FFCCCC"| 8
|align=right|26||align=right|8||align=right|7||align=right|11
|align=right|45||align=right|51||align=right|31
||First round
|Relegated
|-
|2017
|3. divisjon
|align=right |6
|align=right|26||align=right|11||align=right|6||align=right|9
|align=right|44||align=right|39||align=right|39
||First round
|
|-
|2018
|3. divisjon
|align=right |6
|align=right|26||align=right|13||align=right|3||align=right|10
|align=right|57||align=right|52||align=right|42
||Second round
|
|-
|2019
|3. divisjon
|align=right bgcolor="#FFCCCC"| 12
|align=right|26||align=right|8||align=right|3||align=right|15
|align=right|33||align=right|59||align=right|27
||Second round
|Relegated
|-
|2020
|colspan="11"|Season cancelled
|-
|2021
|4. divisjon
|align=right bgcolor=#DDFFDD| 1
|align=right|8||align=right|8||align=right|0||align=right|0
|align=right|42||align=right|5||align=right|24
||Third round
|Promoted
|-
|2022
|3. divisjon
|align=right bgcolor="#FFCCCC"| 12
|align=right|26||align=right|7||align=right|2||align=right|17
|align=right|50||align=right|78||align=right|23
||Second round
|Relegated
|}
Source:

References

External links
 Official site 

Football clubs in Norway
Sport in Troms
Harstad
Association football clubs established in 1903
Defunct athletics clubs in Norway
Futsal clubs in Norway
1903 establishments in Norway